Aero Holland is a defunct airline from the Netherlands. It started operations in 1949 and ceased in 1953. On 20 November 1949, 34 people were killed in the Hurum air disaster when an Aero Holland Douglas DC-3 crashed at Hurum, Norway, with only one survivor.

References

 
Defunct airlines of the Netherlands
Airlines established in 1949
Airlines disestablished in 1953